Hans Christian Wilz (born 1965 or 1966), is an American politician from the state of Iowa.

Wilz was born in Ottumwa, Iowa and has resided there ever since.

Electoral history
*incumbent

2022

References

External links
Hans Wilz @Ballotpedia

Living people
1965 births
Republican Party members of the Iowa House of Representatives
People from Ottumwa, Iowa
21st-century American politicians